Roberts Vidžus (born 3 December 1992) is a Latvian Sprinter and Bobsleigh brakeman.

In 2016, he won Latvian Indoor Championships, with time 6.93s over 60m sprint, and 4 × 200 m relay, with time 1:30,70, also he was 3rd in 200m with a PB time 22.46. In 2015, he returned to the Athletics and finished 2nd in Nationals in 100m with a PB time of 10.92 and 4th in 200m with another PB 22.05s. In 2011, he won U20 Nationals 100m with a personal best time of 11.12 and placed 2nd in 200m with 22.78 also 2nd in 4x100 relay with a time of 43.83.

From 2018 to 2019, he was brakeman on the Latvian National bobsleigh team.

Personal bests

Indoors

References

Athlete profile
All-Athletics Profile

1992 births
Living people
Latvian male sprinters